1TV was a Television channel in North Macedonia. Editor was Aco Kabranov. Owner of the company BMJ MEDIA GROUP DOO Skopje was Mile Jovanovski.

References

Television channels in North Macedonia
Mass media in Skopje
24-hour television news channels